Kishan Singh Sangwan (15 June 1948 - 2 December 2012)  was a member of the 14th Lok Sabha of India. He represents the Sonepat constituency of Haryana and is a member of the Bharatiya Janata Party (BJP) political party.

References

1948 births
2012 deaths
People from Sonipat district
Bharatiya Janata Party politicians from Haryana
India MPs 2004–2009
People from Sonipat
India MPs 1998–1999
India MPs 1999–2004
Lok Sabha members from Haryana
Indian National Lok Dal politicians